The Pan-Armenian Games are a multi-sport event, held between competitors from the Armenian diaspora and Armenia. They consist of various competitions in individual and team sports among the Armenian athletes. It takes place in Yerevan, the capital of Armenia.

Eligibility 

The Games are open to Armenian passport-holders (irrespective of national origin) and citizens of other countries who have Armenian descent.  Spouses of those of Armenian descent are also eligible to compete.

History 

The idea of holding a Pan-Armenians Games came from Soviet diplomat Ashot Melik-Shahnazaryan, who first thought of the idea of organizing universal games for all Armenians while he was on a business trip in 1965 to Brazzaville, Republic of Congo, that was getting ready to participate in the first Pan-African Games. But because Armenia was a Soviet republic and that such an idea was considered by Moscow to be nationalistic, Shahnazaryan had to wait until Armenia attained independence to try to put forth his brainchild.

In 1995, Melik-Shahnazaryan for the first time publicly announced his intentions to create the Pan-Armenians Games while he was in Paris as a guest for World Games of AGBU. He quickly gained the support of the Armenian diaspora with whom he did not have any contact during Soviet times.  The idea of organizing sporting events for all Armenians and the motto of the future World Committee "Unity through Sport" was highly supported by representatives of Homenetmen, AGBU and Homenmen in diasporan cities such as Los Angeles, Toronto, Montreal, Buenos Aires, Beirut, Paris, London and many others.

During the founding meeting on 30 April 1997, in Yerevan, World Committee of Pan-Armenian Games (WCPAG) was created, with the help of traditional Armenian unions of the Diaspora and the Iranian-Armenian cultural-sport organization "Ararat". Representatives of state and public organizations of Armenia, Artsakh and also Armenian communities from Iran,  Argentina, Turkey, Australia, Germany, Canada, Cyprus, France and other countries became members. Ashot Melik-Shahnazaryan was elected the first president of WCPAG. He also became the creator of the emblem, cup, medals, almost all the symbols of the organization and also the official anthem and the farewell song of the games.

Today, the WCPAG is a non-governmental, international organization that collaborates with the International Olympic Committee (IOC), UNESCO, the Council of Europe and other international sport units and contributes in developing sport in Armenia.

The Games 

The Pan-Armenian Games are complex competitions in individual and team kinds of sport among athletes of Armenia and athletes of Armenian origin from other countries. The athletes from various parts of the world represent the cities in which they come from and not countries like other pan-games. The Pan-Armenian Games take place mainly in Yerevan, Armenia. The sports played during the games are football, mini-football, basketball, volleyball, swimming, badminton, tennis, table tennis, chess, and athletics.

The first Pan-Armenian Games took place from 28 August 1999 to 5 September 1999. Delegations from 62 cities and 23 countries participated in the games.

In 2003, it was decided to transform the Games into once every four years (instead of once every two years).

The Games are mostly held in Yerevan, Armenia. However, the opening ceremony of the 7th Pan-Armenian Games was hosted for the first time in Stepanakert, the capital of the Republic of Artsakh in August 2019.

The medals won by cities (Top 5) 

The medals won by cities

See also 

 Armenia at the Olympics
 Armenian Olympic Committee
 List of multi-sport events
 Sport in Armenia

Notes

Multi-sport events
Multi-sport events in Armenia
Recurring sporting events established in 1999
Summer events in Armenia